Gallatin College may refer to the following schools in the United States:

 Gallatin College, Montana State University
 Gallatin School of Individualized Study, New York University

See also
 Gallatin High School (disambiguation)
 Gallatin School (Uniontown, Pennsylvania)